Claustula is a fungal genus in the family Claustulaceae. It is monotypic, containing the single truffle-like species Claustula fischeri, described in 1926 and found in New Zealand and Tasmania. In May 2016, it was one of two native New Zealand fungi was added to the IUCN Red List of Threatened Species as endangered.

References

External links
 
 Claustula fischeri discussed on RNZ Critter of the Week, 2 December 2016.
 

Phallales
Monotypic Basidiomycota genera
Fungi of New Zealand
Fungi of Australia